N. Dash is an American artist who works primarily in painting. Dash lives and works in New York. Born in 1980 in Miami, Dash studied at New York University (B.A. 2003), before earning a Master's in Fine Art from Columbia University (M.FA. 2010).

Exhibitions 
In 2022, the artist presented earth, a solo exhibition at Stedelijk Museum voor Actuele Kunst (S.M.A.K.), Ghent, Belgium. In 2019, the work was the subject of exhibitions at The Aldrich Contemporary Art Museum in Ridgefield, CT and the Museum of Contemporary Art Santa Barbara, CA. In 2015, Dash presented a solo exhibition at the Hammer Museum in L.A. Additional solo institutional exhibitions include: Fondazione Giuliani, Rome and White Flag Projects, St. Louis as well as solo presentations at Zeno X Gallery, Antwerp; Casey Kaplan, New York; and Galerie Mehdi-Chouakri, Berlin. Dash's work has been included in numerous group exhibitions at institutions including the San Francisco Museum of Modern Art; the Dallas Museum of Art; Sammlung Goetz, Munich; American University Museum, Washington D.C.; Fowler Museum at UCLA, Los Angeles; the Jewish Museum, New York; Birmingham Museum of Art, Alabama; MAXXI Museum, Rome; Palazzo Strozzi, Florence, as well as the Flag Art Foundation, New York.

N. Dash is the subject of a comprehensive monograph published by Gregory R. Miller and Hatje Cantz Verlag which includes major works from 2011 to 2021, and essays by Suzanne Hudson, Ajay Kurian, Ross Simonini, Michael Taussig and a poem by John Giorno, which explore Dash's work in art historical, anthropological, and environmental contexts.

Selected Public Collections 

 Blanton Museum of Art, Austin, TX
 Dallas Museum of Art,
 Goetz Collection, Munich, Germany
 Hammer Museum, Los Angeles, CA
 Kadist, Paris, France and San Francisco, CA
 Kupferstichkabinett, Berlin, Germany
 Museum of Modern Art, New York, NY
 S.M.A.K., Ghent, Belgium
 San Francisco Museum of Modern Art, San Francisco, CA
 Solomon R. Guggenheim Museum, New York, NY
 UC Berkeley Art Museum and Pacific Film Archive, Berkeley, CA
 Whitney Museum of American Art, New York, NY

Publications 
N. Dash. Texts by John Giorno, Suzanne Hudson, Ajay Kurian, Ross Simonini, and Michael Taussig. Published by Gregory R. Miller & Co., New York, 2022.

References

External links 
 Hammer Projects: N. Dash, Hammer Museum, Los Angeles
 Wilson, Michael. "N. Dash: The Aldrich Contemporary Art Museum," Artforum
 Lehmann, Claire. "Critic's Pick: N. Dash," Artforum, May 20, 2016
 Pogrebin, Robin, "Inside Art: Art of the Wear and Tear," The New York Times, January 28, 2016
 Linnert, Nicolas. "N. Dash Hammer Museum," Artforum, April 2015
 Li, Jennifer S., "Exhibition Reviews: N. Dash," Art In America, January 2015
 "Going on About Town: Jewish Museum 'Repetition and Difference'," The New Yorker, April 2015.

21st-century American artists
1980 births
Living people